Castle Rock railway station (Station code: CLR) is a small railway station in Uttara Kannada, Karnataka. It serves Castle Rock city. The station consists of two platforms. The platforms are not well sheltered. It lacks many facilities including water and sanitation.

The station was built by West of India Portuguese Railway and was connected with the line from Londa. The terminus of the line today is Vasco da Gama railway station.

Major trains
 Amaravati Express
 Yesvantpur–Vasco da Gama Express
 Vasco da Gama–Velankanni Weekly Express
 Vasco–Chennai Express
 Goa Express
 Poorna Express (via )
 Miraj–Castle Rock Express
 Tirupati - Vasco da Gama Express (17419)
 Jasidh - Vasco da Gama Express (17322)

References

Railway stations in Uttara Kannada district
Hubli railway division